Abramovskaya is a rural locality (a village) in Maloshuyskoye Urban Settlement of Onezhsky District, Arkhangelsk Oblast, Russia. The population was 237 as of 2010. There are 3 streets.

Geography 
It is located on the Maloshuyka River, 975 km southwest of Onega (the district's administrative centre) by road. Maloshuyka is the nearest rural locality.

References 

Rural localities in Onezhsky District